Belen Belediyespor is a football club located in Belen near Hatay, southern Turkey. The team competes in Turkish Regional Amateur League.

League participations 
Turkish Regional Amateur League: 2015–present

League performances

References

External links 
Belen Belediyespor on TFF.org

Football clubs in Hatay